Tegillarca granosa (also known as Anadara granosa) is a species of ark clam known as the blood cockle or blood clam due to the red haemoglobin liquid inside the soft tissues. It is found throughout the Indo-Pacific region from the eastern coast of South Africa northwards and eastwards to Southeast Asia, Australia, Polynesia, and up to northern Japan. It lives mainly in the intertidal zone at one to two metres water depth, burrowed down into sand or mud. Adult size is about 5 to 6 cm long and 4 to 5 cm wide.

<div align=center>
Right and left valve of the same specimen:

</div align=center>

It has a high economic value as food, and it is kept in aquaculture. On the coast of Zhejiang Province alone, blood cockle plantations occupy around 145,000 mu (about 100 km2) of mudflats. These clams are raised in the river estuaries of the neighboring Fujian Province as well.

The meat of this bivalve is served steamed, boiled, roasted, or traditionally raw.

Safety
Some sources of blood cockle may not undergo the depuration process. Therefore, certain styles of preparation, such as the poaching commonly carried out in Shanghai, can leave many pathogens present.

Culinary use
In Korea, blood cockles are called kkomak and are cooked and seasoned with soy sauce, chili powder, and sesame oil.

In Indonesia, blood cockles (local: kerang darah) are quite popular food and are served as various dishes including boiled, deep fried or sauteed.

References

 Leung KF. & Morton B. (2003). Effects of long-term anthropogenic perturbations on three subtidal epibenthic molluscan communities in Hong Kong. In: Morton B, editor. Proceedings of an International Workshop Reunion Conference, Hong Kong: Perspectives on Marine Environment Change in Hong Kong and Southern China, 1977-2001. Hong Kong University Press, Hong Kong. pp 655-717
 Liu, J.Y. [Ruiyu] (ed.). (2008). Checklist of marine biota of China seas. China Science Press. 1267 pp.
 Huber, M. (2010). Compendium of bivalves. A full-color guide to 3,300 of the world’s marine bivalves. A status on Bivalvia after 250 years of research. Hackenheim: ConchBooks. 901 pp., 1 CD-ROM

External links

 Linnaeus, C. (1758). Systema Naturae per regna tria naturae, secundum classes, ordines, genera, species, cum characteribus, differentiis, synonymis, locis. Editio decima, reformata [10th revised edition, vol. 1: 824 pp. Laurentius Salvius: Holmiae]
 Gmelin J.F. (1791). Vermes. In: Gmelin J.F. (Ed.) Caroli a Linnaei Systema Naturae per Regna Tria Naturae, Ed. 13. Tome 1(6). G.E. Beer, Lipsiae [Leipzig. pp. 3021-3910]
 Lightfoot, J. (1786). A Catalogue of the Portland Museum, lately the property of the Dutchess Dowager of Portland, deceased; which will be sold by auction by Mr. Skinner & Co. (book). London. viii + 194 pp
 Iredale, T. (1939). Mollusca. Part I. Scientific Reports of the Great Barrier Reef Expedition 1928-1929. 5(6): 209-425, pls 1-7
 FAO Profile, including production figures and range

granosa
Molluscs described in 1758
Taxa named by Carl Linnaeus